Duke Hui (Chinese: 惠公) is the posthumous name of some monarchs.

List 
 Western Zhou Duke Hui of Song (宋惠公)
 Western Zhou Duke Hui of Lai
 Eastern Zhou Duke Hui of Ying
 Eastern Zhou Duke Hui of Wey (衛惠公)
 Eastern Zhou Duke Hui of Lu (魯惠公)
 Eastern Zhou Duke Hui of Qi (惠公)
 Eastern Zhou Duke Hui I of Qin (秦惠公), reigned 500-492 BC
 Eastern Zhou Duke Hui II of Qin (秦惠公), reigned 399-387 BC
 Eastern Zhou Duke Hui of Jin (晋惠公)
 Eastern Zhou Duke Hui of Yan (燕惠公) (another posthumous name is Duke Jian)
 Eastern Zhou Duke Hui of Chen (陳惠公)
 Eastern Zhou Duke Hui of Jie (薛惠公)
 Eastern Zhou Duke Hui of Fei (费惠公)
 Eastern Zhou Duke Hui of Xiaozhou (小邾惠公)
 Eastern Zhou Duke Hui of Western Zhou (西周惠公)
 Eastern Zhou Duke Hui of Eastern Zhou (东周惠公)
 Ming dynasty Ding Guo Kang Hui Gong

See also 
 Emperor Hui (disambiguation)
 King Hui (disambiguation)
 Prince Hui (disambiguation)
 Emperor Wen (disambiguation)
 King Wen (disambiguation)
 Prince Wen